"Way Cool Jr." is a single by the American heavy metal band Ratt. It is the third track on their 1988 album, Reach for the Sky. It reached number 75 on the Billboard Hot 100. The song's lyrics focus mainly on a handsome, charismatic young man leading the high life while dealing in illicit drugs.

Track listing 
"Way Cool Jr." - 4:27
"Chain Reaction" - 3:42

Personnel 
Stephen Pearcy – vocals
Warren DeMartini – co-lead guitar
Robbin Crosby – co-lead guitar
Juan Croucier – bass guitar
Bobby Blotzer – drums, washboard, harmonica

Charts

References

American blues rock songs
Ratt songs
1989 singles
Song recordings produced by Beau Hill
Songs written by Beau Hill
Songs written by Warren DeMartini
Songs written by Stephen Pearcy
1989 songs
Atlantic Records singles